Margaret Buckley (née Goulding; ; July 1879 – 24 July 1962) was an Irish republican and president of Sinn Féin from 1937 to 1950. She was the first female leader of Sinn Féin and was the first Irishwoman to lead a political party.

Early life
Born in Cork, the daughter of James Goulding and Ellen Foyle, Margaret joined Inghinidhe na hÉireann, which was founded in 1900, taking an active role in the women's movement.  She was involved in anti-British royal visit protests in 1903 and 1907 and was among the group that founded An Dún in Cork in 1910. In 1906, she married Patrick Buckley, described as "a typical rugby-playing British civil servant". After his death she moved into a house in Marguerite Road, Glasnevin, Dublin. Later, she returned to Cork to care for her elderly father.

Revolutionary
Arrested in the aftermath of Easter Rising she was released in the amnesty of June 1917 and played a prominent role in the reorganisation of Sinn Féin.  She was involved in the War of Independence in Cork. 

After the death of her father, she returned to Dublin. In 1920, she became a Dáil Court (also known as Republican Courts) judge in the North city circuit, appointed by Austin Stack, the Minister for Home Affairs of the Irish Republic.

She opposed the Anglo-Irish Treaty and was interned in Mountjoy and Kilmainham, where she went on a hunger strike. She was released in October 1923. During her imprisonment, she was elected Officer Commanding (OC) of the republican prisoners in Mountjoy, Quartermaster (QM) in the North Dublin Union and OC of B-Wing in Kilmainham. She was an active member of the Women Prisoners' Defence League, founded by Maud Gonne and Charlotte Despard in 1922.

In 1929, she served as a member of Comhairle na Poblachta which unsuccessfully attempted to resolve the differences between Sinn Féin and the Irish Republican Army.

Buckley was also an organiser for the Irish Women Workers' Union.

President of Sinn Féin
At the October 1934 Sinn Féin ardfheis, she was elected one of the party's vice-presidents. Three years later in 1937 she succeeded Cathal Ó Murchadha who was a former TD of the second Dáil Éireann as President of Sinn Féin, at an ardfheis attended by only forty delegates, making her the first Irishwoman to lead a political party.

When she assumed the leadership of Sinn Féin, the party was not supported by the Irish Republican Army (IRA), which had severed its links with the party in 1925. When she left the office in 1950, relations with the IRA had been resolved. As President she began the lawsuit Buckley v. Attorney-General, the Sinn Féin Funds case, in which the party sought unsuccessfully to be recognised as owners of money raised by Sinn Féin before 1922 and held in trust in the High Court since 1924.

In 1938, she published her book The Jangle of the Keys about the experiences of Irish Republican women prisoners interned by the Irish Free State. In 1956, her book Short History of Sinn Féin was published.

She was active in the cause of Sinn Fein well into her late seventies. She served as honorary vice-president of Sinn Féin from 1950 until her death in 1962. She was the only member of the ardchomairle of the party not to be arrested during a police raid in July 1957.

She died on 24 July 1962 and is buried in St. Finbarr's Cemetery, Cork.

References

Sources
 "Margaret Buckley, president of Sinn Féin", Saoirse Irish Freedom, July 1998.

1879 births
1962 deaths
20th-century Irish women politicians
Cumann na mBan members
Early Sinn Féin politicians
Irish feminists
Irish republicans interned without trial
Leaders of Sinn Féin
People of the Irish Civil War (Anti-Treaty side)
Politicians from County Cork
People from Glasnevin